Sila may refer to:
Sila language (Chad)
Sila language (Sino-Tibetan), of Vietnam and Laos

See also 
Silla language